Hopperton is a village in the Harrogate district of North Yorkshire, England. It is part of the Allerton Mauleverer with Hopperton parish.  The village is situated close to the A59, the A1(M) and the A168.  Cattal railway station is situated just under two miles from the village with services to Leeds, York and Harrogate.  Until 1958, Hopperton had its own railway station next to a level crossing on the original A1 Great North Road.  The village has one pub, the Mason Arms, and a bed and breakfast.  The nearest towns are Knaresborough  to the west, and across the county border in West Yorkshire, Wetherby  to the south west. The latter offers the closest large supermarket to Hopperton.

References

External links

Welcome to the villages of Allerton Mauleverer & Hopperton

Villages in North Yorkshire